The lesser hoopoe-lark (Alaemon hamertoni) is a species of lark in the family Alaudidae. It is endemic to Somalia where its natural habitat is subtropical or tropical dry lowland grassland.

Taxonomy and systematics
The lesser hoopoe-lark has alternately been named Witherby's lark.

Subspecies 
Three subspecies are recognized:
 Warangeli lesser hoopoe-lark (A. h. alter) - Witherby, 1905: Found in northern and north-eastern Somalia
 Burao lesser hoopoe-lark (A. h. tertius) - Clarke, S, 1919: Found in north-western Somalia
 A. h. hamertoni - Witherby, 1905: Found in central Somalia

References

lesser hoopoe-lark
Endemic birds of Somalia
lesser hoopoe-lark
Taxonomy articles created by Polbot